"Me Gusta" is a song by Czech singer Mikolas Josef. It was released as a Digital download on 5 October 2018 through Sony Music Entertainment.

Music video
A music video to accompany the release of "Me Gusta" was first released onto YouTube on 4 October 2018 at a total length of two minutes and fifty-six seconds.

Track listing

Charts

Release history

References

2018 singles
2018 songs
Songs written by Joacim Persson
Mikolas Josef songs